Agnostic Hymns and Stoner Fables is the eleventh studio album by American singer-songwriter Todd Snider, released on March 6, 2012 by Aimless Records.

Critical reception
Agnostic Hymns and Stoner Fables received mostly favorable reviews from critics, its themes of economic inequality resonating with critics. Daryl Sanders described the record in The East Nashvillian as a “one-man Occupy Wall Street movement.” In his review for Rolling Stone, Jody Rosen called it “Occupy Nashville.” Writing in Relix, Jewly Hight said Snider “plays the part of a winking, pot-stirring anarchist” on the album. In a piece for NPR, Ken Tucker said, “If one line could sum up the album, it's ‘It ain't the despair that gets you / It's the hope.’" Both Rolling Stone and Paste named it one of the fifty best albums of 2012.

Track listing

Personnel

Musicians
 Todd Snider – lead vocals, acoustic and electric guitar, harmonica
 Paul Griffith – drums and percussion
 Eric McConnell – bass guitar
 Amanda Shires – violin and background vocals
 Chad Staehly - B3 organ
 Mick Utley – background vocals on “Too Soon To Tell”
 Jason Isbell – background vocals and slide guitar on “Digger Dave’s Crazy Woman Blues”

Production
 Todd Snider, Eric McConnell – producers
 Eric McConnell - engineer
 Brandon Henegar - mixing engineer
 Alex McCullough - mastering engineer

References

Todd Snider albums
2012 albums